On May 1, 2020, a group of Afghan refugees tried to enter Iran and drowned in the Hari River on the border between Iran and Afghanistan.

Reuters and other new agencies reported, quoting Afghan lawmakers, that Iran's border guards killed the migrants by forcing them into the river at gunpoint.

Incident 
50 to 70 Afghan refugees tried to enter Iran by crossing the Hari River, which borders Herat Province with Iran, on May 1, 2020. These Afghans, according to some Afghan officials and the survivors, were arrested by Iranian border guards and after being beaten and tortured they were thrown into the Hari River.

The Afghan Foreign Ministry said in a statement that an investigation had been launched into the incident and that initial assessments indicated that at least 70 Afghans trying to enter Iran from the border province of Herat had been beaten and thrown into the Hari River.

Victims 
By May 7, 2020, the bodies of 17 drowned immigrants had been found. According to Abdul Ghani Nouri, the governor of Gulan in Herat Province, there are signs of torture on the bodies.

Survivors 
Reuters has quoted Noor Mohammad, one of the survivors of the incident, that “After being tortured, the Iranian soldiers threw all of us in the Hari River,”

One survivor told reporters the guards hit him with a pipe and pushed him into the river. Another said they had beaten him before throwing him into the river.

Statements by Iranian officials denying the charges
Due to the slope of the Harirod River, Iranian officials have denied the allegations, as the bodies must have been found in Iranian soil,  but according to the  Afghan workers comments, the bodies were found on Afghan soil, so it would not be acceptable for Iranian border guards to throw the Afghans into Hari. Afghan officials blamed that the Iranian guards had entered well into the Afghan territory.

The forensic doctor of Herat city declared that there is no evidence of torture on the bodies. Also, due to the muddy nature of the Helmand River, no traces of mud have been seen on the bodies.

Reactions 
Former President Ashraf Ghani of Afghanistan had ordered an investigation into the incident. Ghani formed a ten-member team to check the recovered bodies. Signs of torture on some of the bodies have been observed.
On 11 May, hundreds of Afghans gathered in front of the Iranian Consulate in Herat to show their anger towards the death of their fellow citizens who were allegedly drowned by Iranian border guards. The crowd chanted, “Death to Rouhani, Death to Khamenei,”

See also 
May 2020 Afghanistan attacks

References

2020 in international relations
May 2020 events in Afghanistan
May 2020 events in Iran
2020 disasters in Afghanistan
21st century in Herat Province
Deaths by drowning
Afghan refugees
Afghanistan–Iran border
Afghanistan–Iran relations